Adauto Donizete Domingues (born 20 May 1961 in São Caetano do Sul) is a retired middle-distance runner from Brazil, who twice won the gold medal in the men's 3000 metres steeplechase at the Pan American Games: in 1987 and 1991. He represented his native country at the 1988 Summer Olympics.

International competitions

References

 Profile
 

1961 births
Living people
Sportspeople from São Paulo (state)
Brazilian male steeplechase runners
Brazilian male middle-distance runners
Olympic athletes of Brazil
Athletes (track and field) at the 1988 Summer Olympics
Pan American Games gold medalists for Brazil
Pan American Games medalists in athletics (track and field)
Athletes (track and field) at the 1987 Pan American Games
Athletes (track and field) at the 1991 Pan American Games
Brazilian male cross country runners
Medalists at the 1987 Pan American Games
Medalists at the 1991 Pan American Games
21st-century Brazilian people
20th-century Brazilian people